Carol Tyler (born November 20, 1951) is an American painter, educator, comedian, and eleven-time Eisner Award-nominated cartoonist known for her autobiographical comics. She has received multiple honors for her work including the Cartoonist Studio Prize, the Ohio Arts Council Excellence Award, and was declared a Master Cartoonist at the 2016 Cartoon Crossroads Columbus Festival at the Billy Ireland Cartoon Library & Museum.

Biography 
Born and raised in Chicago, Illinois, she attended Catholic schools, K -12, and Middle Tennessee State University where she achieved a Bachelor of Fine Arts degree. Tyler became interested in the underground comics movement while pursuing a master's degree in painting at Syracuse University in the early 1980s. This interest brought her to the underground comics hotbed of San Francisco.

Her first comics publication was the 1987 story "Uncovered Property", in Weirdo. Tyler's short slice-of-life stories and her distinctive artwork brought her critical attention as one of a growing number of female artists shaping the direction of underground/alternative comics in North America in the 1980s; she appeared in the influential feminist anthologies Wimmen's Comix and Twisted Sisters.<ref>Meier, Samantha "Between Feminism and the Underground," The Hooded Utilitarian (Feb. 5, 2014).</ref>The Complete Wimmen's Comix page, Fantagraphics website. Accessed Aug. 5, 2016. Her first solo book, The Job Thing, was published in 1993. She produced short comics for publications including LA Weekly, Pulse (Tower Records), Strip AIDS, Heck, and Zero Zero.

Tyler also performed live comedy with the Rick & Ruby Patio Show at LA's The Comedy Store, the Great American Music Hall in San Francisco, and the Clunie Center in Sacramento.

Her second solo work, Late Bloomer, was published by Fantagraphics in 2005. It's a career highlight collection including both previously published and new material. In his foreword, Robert Crumb says, "She's tops in my book. One of the best artists alive and working in the comics medium. Her work has the extremely rare quality of authentic HEART. Hers are the only comics that ever brought me to the verge of tears."

Tyler's most recent completed project was a trilogy. You'll Never Know is her search for the truth about what happened to her father during World War II, and also about the damage his war had on her future relationships. The New York Times called it "  a vivid, affecting, eccentrically stylish frame built around a terrible silence." Book One: A Good & Decent Man was released in May 2009. Book Two: Collateral Damage was released in July 2010. The final installment of the trilogy, Book Three: Soldier's Heart, was released in October 2012.

Tyler teaches a comics class at the University of Cincinnati College of Design, Architecture, Art, and Planning. Her primary focus is teaching students the methods and techniques of comic creation. In teaching the history of comics "Tyler can pull out almost the entire history of comics in this country, everything from 1930s classics to 1950s comic magazines teaching aspects of African American history (regarding Harriet Tubman and Crispus Attucks) to an original of the first issue of the iconoclastic Mad Magazine." She has also brought her current book theme, military service, into the classroom.Reilly, M.B. "Just in Time for Memorial Day: UC Arts Leadership Brings 'Comic Relief' to Veterans,"  University of Cincinnati News (May 19, 2009).

Another cartooning endeavor is a series of one-page stories called "Tomatoes" for Cincinnati magazine. Based upon her experiences of growing tomatoes and friendships in the heart of the city, "Tomatoes" appears monthly on the publication's inside back page.

Tyler was a 2016 Civitella Ranieri residency fellow. She is also a Residency artist through the Arts Learning Program with the Ohio Arts Council.

In 2016, Tyler spoke at the Billy Ireland Cartoon Art Museum on "... the unique challenges of autobiographical storytelling set in real time with real characters." She also spoke at The Society of Illustrators.

DAAP Galleries staged a major one-woman exhibit of Tyler's work which included "...written entries of her ascent into illustration, accompanied by artworks and sketches from throughout her career," and "...eclectic 3-D creations...A flashing, multicolored light inside of a star rotates along one wall. An interactive piece called the "Ego-Meter" asks viewers to pull a string that raises a wooden face up the meter. A creepy baby doll spins around on a stick...an excellent job of showcasing an inspirational artist and professor at UC".

In 2017 she gave a talk about her process of creating Soldier's Heart at the Library of Congress, titled "Comics to a 'T".

In 2020, Carol Tyler's work was chosen to be a part of the Society of Illustrators Museum exhibit "Women in Comics: Looking Forward, Looking Back".

From November 5–20, 2021, "Shaping Grief: Carol Tyler's Mourning Mind" an interactive art experience was featured at the DSGN Collective in Cincinnati, OH. It was composed of comics, repurposed objects, murals, mobiles, and a giant mourning bonnet which served as a gateway through which people would walk to observe the exhibit.

 Personal life 
Tyler lived in Cincinnati with her husband until his death, the cartoonist Justin Green (1945-2022). They met in San Francisco in the early 1980s and have a child, Julia Green.

 Awards 
In 2016, Carol Tyler received the Cartoonist Studio Prize from the Slate Book Review. With fellow recipient Sergio Aragones, she accepted the Master Cartoonist Award from Cartoon Crossroads Columbus.You'll Never Know, Book I: A Good & Decent Man, Book II: Collateral Damage, and Book III: Soldier's Heart have been nominated for many awards in the comics industry, including eleven Eisner Award nominations for Best writer/artist non-fiction, Best graphic album, Best Lettering and Best Painter/Multimedia Artist, 2 Harvey Awards, and 2 Ignatz Awards. The series was named as a finalist for the 2011 Los Angeles Times Book Prize. In 2016, "A Soldier's Heart" brought Tyler another nomination for an LA Times Book Prize. It also received an Ohio Arts Council Excellence Award.

In 2010, it was named one of "The Most Memorable Comics & Graphic Novels of 2010" by NPR's Glen Weldon. It ranked #5 on Rob Clough's Top 50 Books of 2010 at High-Low. It also made the "Best of 2010" lists at Comic Book Resources, Robot 6, and Politics and Prose. Best American Comics listed it as a "notable comic" in 2011.

Tyler's piece "The Hannah Story", published in Drawn & Quarterly, was nominated for a 1995 Eisner Award and is on the Fantagraphics list of Top 100 Comics of the Twentieth Century.

In 1988, Tyler was awarded the inaugural Dori Seda Memorial Award for Best New Female Cartoonist from Last Gasp.

Bibliography

Graphic novels and anthologies
 Fab4 Mania, Fantagraphics Books, 2018.You'll Never Know: Book III: "Soldier's Heart". Fantagraphics, 2012. 
 You'll Never Know: Book II: "Collateral Damage". Fantagraphics, 2010. 
 You'll Never Know: Book I: "A Good and Decent Man". Fantagraphics, 2009. 
 Late Bloomer. Fantagraphics Books, 2005. 
 Mind Riot: Comic of Age in Comics, Simon and Schuster, 1997. 0689806221
 The Job Thing. Fantagraphics Books, 1993. 

Comics and magazinesWeirdoWimmen's ComixStreet MusicZero ZeroMineshaft MagazinePrime CutsLA WeeklyDrawn & QuarterlyTower Records' Pulse!''

References

External links

1951 births
Living people
Alternative cartoonists
American women cartoonists
Syracuse University alumni
American female comics artists
Artists from Chicago
American cartoonists
21st-century American women